I ragazzi di padre Tobia is an Italian television series.

See also
List of Italian television series

External links
 

Italian television series
1968 Italian television series debuts
1973 Italian television series endings